Michael Cole (born April 13, 1938) is an American psychologist and emeritus distinguished professor at the University of California, San Diego (UCSD), where he held positions in the Department of Psychology, the Department of Communication, and the Human Development Program. His research focuses on the development of a mediational theory of mind, as well as the promotion of partnerships between UCSD and the community.

Career
After teaching as an associate professor at the University of California for three years, Cole joined the faculty of Rockefeller University in 1969, also as an associate professor. He was promoted to a full professor at Rockefeller in 1975. In 1978, he joined the UCSD faculty with a joint appointment in psychology and the Communication Program. In 1995, he became the director of UCSD's Laboratory of Comparative Human Cognition, and in 1999, he was named one of UCSD's university professors.

Professional affiliations
Cole is a member of the National Academy of Education and the American Academy of Arts and Sciences.

References

External links
Faculty page

Living people
1938 births
American cognitive scientists
People from Los Angeles
Rockefeller University faculty
University of California, San Diego faculty
University of California, Los Angeles alumni
Indiana University alumni
Fellows of the American Academy of Arts and Sciences
Fairfax High School (Los Angeles) alumni
American psychologists